The Leicester Riders are a professional basketball team that plays in the British Basketball League (BBL). Previously, the team was also known as Loughborough All-Stars, Leicester All-Stars and the Leicester City Riders.

Since the 1987–88 season, Leicester plays in the top-tier level BBL.

Seasons

Notes:   
From 1999 to 2002 the BBL operated a Conference system. Leicester competed in the Northern Conference.
DNQ denotes Did Not Qualify.